Athena Karkanis (born September 7, 1981) is a Canadian television, film and voice actress. She is noted for her role as Grace Stone in the NBC/Netflix science fiction drama series Manifest.

Life and career 
Karkanis was born in Alberta and raised in Toronto. She is of Greek and Egyptian descent. In 2005, she made her screen debut in an episode of 1-800-Missing and later had a number of guest-starring, recurring and regular roles on Canadian television shows. She also had regular voice roles in Skyland, MetaJets and Total Drama: Revenge of the Island. She has a regular voice role in Wild Kratts as Aviva Corcovado. Karkanis was also the lead voice for the title character in Growing up Creepie. 

Karkanis co-starred in several horror films, including Saw IV (2007), Repo! The Genetic Opera (2008), Saw VI (2009), Survival of the Dead (2009), and The Barrens (2012). She also appeared in direct-to-video action films The Art of War II: Betrayal (2008), and Sacrifice (2011). On television, she was a regular cast member in the first season of Canadian teen drama The Best Years in 2007, in The Border from 2008 to 2010, and in the short-lived comedy series Almost Heroes in 2011. She also had a recurring role in Lost Girl from 2011 to 2012.

Karkanis starred in the AMC drama series Low Winter Sun in 2013. In 2014, she was cast as a series regular in the Lifetime post-apocalyptic drama series, The Lottery. In 2015, she began playing the role of Octavia Muss on The Expanse. From 2018 to 2022, Karkanis played Grace Stone on the TV series Manifest on NBC (seasons 1-3) and on Netflix (season 4).

Filmography

Film

Television

Video games

References

External links
 
 

1981 births
Living people
Actresses from Alberta
Canadian film actresses
Canadian people of Greek descent
Canadian people of Egyptian descent
Canadian soap opera actresses
Canadian television actresses
Canadian voice actresses
McGill University alumni
21st-century Canadian actresses